Matti Mononen (born November 25, 1983 in Rautjärvi) is a Finnish pole vaulter.

He finished fourth at the 2006 European Athletics Championships in Gothenburg. He also competed in the 2004 Olympics, but failed to qualify from his pool, despite equalling his personal best vault of 5.65 metres.

Currently his personal best is 5.70 metres, achieved in July 2005 in Lappeenranta. The Finnish record currently belongs to Jani Lehtonen with 5.82 metres.

References

1983 births
Living people
People from Rautjärvi
Finnish male pole vaulters
Athletes (track and field) at the 2004 Summer Olympics
Olympic athletes of Finland
Sportspeople from South Karelia